The Estonian National Museum founded 1909 in Tartu is a museum devoted to folklorist Jakob Hurt's heritage, to Estonian ethnography and folk art. The first items for the museum were originally collected in the latter part of the 19th century.

The museum tracks the history, life and traditions of the Estonian people, presents the culture and history of other Finnic peoples, and the minorities in Estonia. It has a comprehensive display of traditional Estonian national costumes from all regions. A collection of wood carved beer tankards illustrates the traditional peasant fests and holidays. The exhibition includes an array of other handicrafts from hand-woven carpets to linen tablecloths.

History
The museum opened at Raadi Manor in 1922 with the Finnish ethnographer Ilmari Manninen as its director.  Manninen had been working for Tartu University since 1919. Raadi Manor had been the ancestral home of Baltic German art collectors like Karl Eduard von Liphart and his son Ernst Friedrich von Liphart. They had moved away in 1860 but their collections remained although the most valuable parts had been sold starting in 1920. Although they were lovers of art the Lipharts were not well regarded by the local Estonians. They were seen as "culturally revolting" Baltic German's at that time.

Raadi Airfield was built on the manor's land in 1940. Raadi Manor, the main building of the museum, was destroyed in the Tartu Offensive during World War II. After this the airfield dominated not just the museum but the whole of the city. The airfield became a secret Soviet bomber base and there was no room for the museum's collection.  During this time Tartu's culture was hidden. The museum's artefacts had to be stored in churches and other spare space around the city and the air base meant that foreigners were not allowed to visit the city.

In 2005 the Estonian Ministry of Culture and the Union of Estonian Architects announced together with the museum an international competition for the Estonian National Museum's new building.

The grand opening took place in Autumn 2016. The new single storey building houses the museum as well as supplying conference space and a cinema. The building design incorporates the history of the site including the manor, the war and the airfield.

In August 2021 the head of the museum, Alar Karis, was elected by Estonia's parliament to the position of President of Estonia.

References

External links
  (eesti keeles | in English | suomeksi | no-pyccku)

History museums in Estonia
Museums in Tartu
National museums
Museums established in 1909
1900s establishments in Estonia
Ethnographic museums in Europe